Justice Sharpe may refer to:

Edward M. Sharpe (1887–1975), associate justice of the Michigan Supreme Court
Henry A. Sharpe (1848–1919), associate justice of the Alabama Supreme Court
Nelson Sharpe (1858–1935), associate justice of the Michigan Supreme Court
Robert Sharpe (born 1945), justice of the Court of Appeal for Ontario

See also
Justice Sharp (disambiguation)